Spence was an electoral district of the House of Assembly in the Australian state of South Australia from 1970 to 2002. The district was based in the inner north-west suburbs of Adelaide.

The district was a safe seat for the Labor Party. Spence was renamed Croydon with effect at the 2002 state election.

Members for Spence

Election results

External links
1985 & 1989 election boundaries, page 18 & 19

Former electoral districts of South Australia
1970 establishments in Australia
2002 disestablishments in Australia